Alvand is a city and capital of Alborz County, Qazvin Province, Iran. In the 2006 census, its population was 69,333 people, including a total of 18,004 families.

References 

Alborz County
Cities in Qazvin Province